The 2000 Race of Champions took place on December 10 at Gran Canaria. It was the 13th running of the event, and the ninth running at Gran Canaria. The International Masters contest was held for the final time this year before a format shake-up for 2001, which opened up the main competition to non-rally drivers.

The vehicles used were the Peugeot 206 WRC, The Mitsubishi Lancer Evolution VI WRC, the Toyota Corolla WRC, the Saab 93 rallycross car and the ROC Buggy.

The individual competition was won by Tommi Makinen, whilst the Nations' Cup was won by France with Yvan Muller, Gilles Panizzi and Régis Laconi.

Participants

Race of Champions

Nations Cup

 Marcus Grönholm was to represent the All-Star team, but for an unknown reason his place was taken by Blomqvist.

Legends Race
 Per Eklund & Miki Biasion eliminated in the First Round.

International Masters

 Flavio Alonso secured his place with the quickest time in the Spanish Masters event.
 Armin Schwarz and Tom Kristensen were handed automatic byes to the semi-finals.

Group A

 McShea advanced with the fastest best time.

Group B

Race of Champions

Nations' Cup
Group A

Group B

References

External links
Information sourced from http://www.atodomotor.com/pagina/ROC.html

2000
2000 in motorsport
International sports competitions hosted by Spain
2000 in Spanish motorsport
2000,Race of Champions